The canton of Tude-et-Lavalette is an administrative division of the Charente department, southwestern France. It was created at the French canton reorganisation which came into effect in March 2015. Its seat is in Chalais.

It consists of the following communes:
 
Aubeterre-sur-Dronne
Bardenac
Bazac
Bellon
Bessac
Blanzaguet-Saint-Cybard
Boisné-la-Tude
Bonnes
Bors
Brie-sous-Chalais
Chadurie
Chalais
Châtignac
Combiers
Courgeac
Courlac
Curac
Deviat
Édon
Les Essards
Fouquebrune
Gardes-le-Pontaroux
Gurat
Juignac
Laprade
Magnac-Lavalette-Villars
Médillac
Montboyer
Montignac-le-Coq
Montmoreau
Nabinaud
Nonac
Orival
Palluaud
Pillac
Poullignac
Rioux-Martin
Ronsenac
Rouffiac
Rougnac
Saint-Avit
Saint-Laurent-des-Combes
Saint-Martial
Saint-Quentin-de-Chalais
Saint-Romain
Saint-Séverin
Salles-Lavalette
Vaux-Lavalette
Villebois-Lavalette
Yviers

References

Cantons of Charente